Luis Ramón Jara Heyn (born 29 December 1964 in Asunción, Paraguay) is a former football midfielder and futsal player.

Heyn played association football for most his career in Olimpia Asunción alongside his brother Adolfo for eight years. Heyn also played a few games for the Paraguay national football team during his career, including the U-20 FIFA World Cup of 1985. As a futsal player, he represented the Paraguay national futsal team in the 1989 FIFA Futsal World Cup.

References

Paraguayan footballers
Club Olimpia footballers
Paraguay international footballers
Paraguayan men's futsal players
Living people
1964 births
Association football midfielders